Jayne Meadows (born Jane Cotter; September 27, 1919 – April 26, 2015), also known as Jayne Meadows Allen, was an American stage, film and television actress, as well as an author and lecturer. She was nominated for three Emmy Awards during her career and was the elder sister of actress and memoirist Audrey Meadows as well as the wife of original Tonight Show host Steve Allen.

Early life
Jayne Meadows was born Jane Cotter in 1919, in Wuchang, Wuhan, Hubei Province, China, the elder daughter of American Episcopal missionary parents, the Rev. Francis James Meadows Cotter and his wife, the former Ida Miller Taylor, who had married in 1915. Her younger sister was actress Audrey Meadows. She also had two older brothers. In the early 1930s, the family settled in Sharon, Connecticut, where her father had been appointed rector of Christ Church.

Career
Meadows' most famous movies include: Undercurrent (with Katharine Hepburn), Song of the Thin Man (with William Powell and Myrna Loy), David and Bathsheba (with Gregory Peck, Susan Hayward and Raymond Massey), Lady in the Lake (with Robert Montgomery and Audrey Totter) and Enchantment (with David Niven and Teresa Wright). Louella Parsons presented to Meadows the Cosmopolitan Award for Finest Dramatic Performance of 1949, for Enchantment.

Among her earliest television appearances, Meadows played reporter Helen Brady in a 1953 episode of Suspense opposite Walter Matthau titled, "F.O.B. Vienna". She was a regular panelist on the original version of I've Got a Secret and an occasional panelist on What's My Line?, the latter alongside husband Steve Allen. She also appeared on the NBC interview program Here's Hollywood. During the early days of the burgeoning live entertainment scene in Las Vegas, the Allens occasionally worked together as an act.

Prior to Allen's death in 2000, the couple made several television appearances together.  In 1998, they played an argumentative elderly couple in an episode of Homicide: Life on the Street in which Allen's character accidentally shoots a man who was in the act of committing suicide (by jumping from the roof of the elderly couple's building). In 1999, the couple made their last joint TV appearance (again playing a couple) in the all-star episode of the Dick Van Dyke series Diagnosis: Murder, titled "The Roast", which marked Steve Allen's final screen appearance. She also appeared in City Slickers, as the telephone voice of Billy Crystal's character's over-protective and oversolicitous mother.

Later life and death

She was married to Steve Allen from 1954 until his death in 2000. They had one son, Bill. Allen's three children from his first marriage (Stephen Jr., Brian and David) are her stepchildren.

Meadows was active in Republican affairs although Steve Allen was a Democrat. She was the recipient of several honorary Doctor of Humane Letters degrees from various universities.

Meadows remained active until 2009 when she fell and fractured her hip. Her last public appearance was in August 2009 at the Early TV Memories First-Class Commemorative Stamp Dedication Ceremony. She died on April 26, 2015, of natural causes at her home in Encino, California, aged 95. She is buried at Forest Lawn Memorial Park in the Hollywood Hills, beside Steve Allen.

Filmography

References

External links
 
 
 
 
 

1919 births
2015 deaths
Actresses from Connecticut
American film actresses
American stage actresses
American television actresses
Republic of China (1912–1949) emigrants to the United States
American memoirists
Burials at Forest Lawn Memorial Park (Hollywood Hills)
People from Sharon, Connecticut
RCA Victor artists
California Republicans
Connecticut Republicans
20th-century American actresses
American women memoirists
Actresses from Hubei
20th-century American Episcopalians
21st-century American women